KCIS (630 kHz) is an AM radio station licensed to Edmonds, Washington, and serving the Seattle metropolitan area.  The station is owned by Crista Ministries and airs a Christian talk and teaching radio format.  National and local religious leaders buy blocks of time from KCIS to air their shows, and they may seek donations to their ministries while on the air.

KCIS is powered at 5,000 watts by day, using a non-directional signal.  The daytime transmitter is co-located with the studios and offices, on Freemont Avenue North at Kings Garden Drive in Seattle.  But to avoid interfering with other stations on AM 630, it reduces power at night to 2,500 watts, using a directional antenna.  The nighttime tower array is off Kaltenborn Road in Snohomish.

Programming
During the day and evening, KCIS airs mostly national religious shows hosted by Christian leaders such as Jim Daly, David Jeremiah, Chuck Swindoll and June Hunt.  Overnight and during some daytime hours, the station plays soft Christian music.

History
In 1954, the station signed on as KGDN.  It was originally a 1,000 watt daytimer station operating from King's Garden, the former name of Crista Ministries.  The call sign referred to King's Garden.

In 1960, KGDN added an FM station at 105.3 MHz.  At first it was simulcast with KGDN but later switched to separate religious programming and Christian music.  Its first call sign was KGFM, later KBIQ and today KCMS, still co-owned with KCIS.  In the 1970s, the power was boosted to 5,000 watts, but still as a daytime-only station.

In 1985, it switched to the current call letters KCIS.  The station received Federal Communications Commission (FCC) permission for 24-hour broadcasting, with nighttime power at 2,500 watts, using a directional antenna from a site in Snohomish.

References

External links
FCC History Cards for KCIS

CIS
Edmonds, Washington
Radio stations established in 1954